Joy is a community in Murray County, Oklahoma, United States. It was named for the nearby Joy School. Joy School, in turn, was the name selected from a 1922 student contest to choose a new name when the Carr Flats, Talley, and Wheeler schools consolidated.

On May 19, 2010, an EF1 tornado struck Joy, damaging houses, outbuildings, trees and power poles.

On May 9, 2016, an EF2 tornado struck Joy, damaging about 80% of the land area in Joy, damaging houses, trees, and even roads around the area.

References
Shirk, George H.; Oklahoma Place Names; Norman: University of Oklahoma Press, 1987:  .

External links
Abandoned Joy School

Unincorporated communities in Murray County, Oklahoma
Unincorporated communities in Oklahoma